Unión Deportiva Atlético Gramenet "B", usually known as Gramenet B, was a Spanish football team based in Santa Coloma de Gramenet, in the autonomous community of Catalonia. Founded in 1995 after a merger with CD Milán, it was the reserve team of UDA Gramenet, and was dissolved in 2015.

Season to season

3 seasons in Tercera División

External links
Trayectorias de Fútbol profile 
La Preferente team profile 

1995 establishments in Catalonia
2015 disestablishments in Catalonia
Association football clubs established in 1995
Association football clubs disestablished in 2015
Defunct football clubs in Catalonia
UDA Gramenet